Tony Babu (born 11 July 1990) is an Indian film sound designer, sound editor, sound mixer and mixing engineer. He has worked in various Indian language films and web series including Hindi, Marathi, Malayalam and Punjabi. He is a member of the Motion Picture Sound Editors. He won the Kerala State Film Award for Best Sound Designer for The Great Indian Kitchen.

Career
After completing the sound engineering course from Neo Film School, Ernakulam, Tony moved to Mumbai and assisted Boby John for four years. He then works as independent sound editor and designer for various films including C/O Saira Banu, Udaharanam Sujatha, Joseph, Kilometers and Kilometers and The Great Indian Kitchen

Selected filmography

Accolades
 2020 - Kerala State Film Award for Best Sound Designer for The Great Indian Kitchen

References

External links
 Official website
 

Indian sound designers
Indian sound editors
People from Kollam district
Living people
1990 births
Kerala State Film Award winners